In Euclidean geometry, the distance from a point to a line is the shortest distance from a given point to any point on an infinite straight line. It is the perpendicular distance of the point to the line, the length of the line segment which joins the point to nearest point on the line. The formula for calculating it can be derived and expressed in several ways.

Knowing the distance from a point to a line can be useful in various situations—for example, finding the shortest distance to reach a road, quantifying the scatter on a graph, etc. In Deming regression, a type of linear curve fitting, if the dependent and independent variables have equal variance this results in orthogonal regression in which the degree of imperfection of the fit is measured for each data point as the perpendicular distance of the point from the regression line.

Line defined by an equation 

The point on this line which is closest to  has coordinates:

Horizontal and vertical lines

In the general equation of a line,  and  cannot both be zero unless  is also zero, in which case the equation does not define a line.

Line defined by two points 

See: .

Line defined by point and angle 
If the line passes through the point  with angle , then the distance of some point  to the line is

Proofs

An algebraic proof
This proof is valid only if the line is neither vertical nor horizontal, that is, we assume that neither  nor  in the equation of the line is zero.

The line with equation  has slope , so any line perpendicular to it will have slope  (the negative reciprocal). Let  be the point of intersection of the line  and the line perpendicular to it which passes through the point. The line through these two points is perpendicular to the original line, so  

Thus,

and by squaring this equation we obtain:

Now consider,

using the above squared equation. But we also have,

Thus,

and we obtain the length of the line segment determined by these two points,

A geometric proof

This proof is valid only if the line is not horizontal or vertical.

Drop a perpendicular from the point P with coordinates (x0, y0) to the line with equation Ax + By + C = 0. Label the foot of the perpendicular R. Draw the vertical line through P and label its intersection with the given line S. At any point T on the line, draw a right triangle TVU whose sides are horizontal and vertical line segments with hypotenuse TU on the given line and horizontal side of length |B| (see diagram). The vertical side of ∆TVU will have length |A| since the line has slope -A/B.

∆PRS and ∆TVU are similar triangles, since they are both right triangles and ∠PSR ≅ ∠TUV since they are corresponding angles of a transversal to the parallel lines PS and UV (both are vertical lines). Corresponding sides of these triangles are in the same ratio, so:

If point S has coordinates (x0,m) then |PS| = |y0 - m| and the distance from P to the line is:

Since S is on the line, we can find the value of m,

and finally obtain:

A variation of this proof is to place V at P and compute the area of the triangle ∆UVT two ways to obtain that 

A vector projection proof

Let P be the point with coordinates (x0, y0) and let the given line have equation ax + by + c = 0. The length of this projection is given by:

Now,
 so  and 
thus

Since Q is a point on the line, and so,

Although the distance is given as a modulus, the sign can be useful to determine which side of the line the point is on, in a sense determined by the direction of normal vector (a,b)

Another formula 
It is possible to produce another expression to find the shortest distance of a point to a line. This derivation also requires that the line is not vertical or horizontal.

The point P is given with coordinates.
The equation of the normal of that line which passes through the point P is given .

The point at which these two lines intersect is the closest point on the original line to the point P. Hence:

We can solve this equation for x,

The y coordinate of the point of intersection can be found by substituting this value of x into the equation of the original line,

Using the equation for finding the distance between 2 points, we can deduce that the formula to find the shortest distance between a line and a point is the following:

Recalling that m = -a/b and k = - c/b for the line with equation ax + by + c = 0, a little algebraic simplification reduces this to the standard expression.

Vector formulation

The equation of a line can be given in vector form:

 

Then as scalar t varies,  gives the locus of the line.

The distance of an arbitrary point  to this line is given by

 

Then  is the projected length onto the line and so

Thus

is the component of  perpendicular to the line. The distance from the point to the line is then just the norm of that vector. This more general formula is not restricted to two dimensions.

Another vector formulation 

If the vector space is orthonormal and if the line goes through point  and has a direction vector , the distance between point  and the line is

 

Note that cross products only exist in dimensions 3 and 7.

See also 
 Hesse normal form
 Line-line intersection
 Distance between two lines
 Distance from a point to a plane
 Skew lines#Distance

Notes

References

Further reading

Euclidean geometry
Vectors (mathematics and physics)
Distance